Kampong Glam Group Representation Constituency (GRC) is a former four member Group Representation Constituency in the Central Business District of Singapore, only in 1991 election. Kampong Glam GRC was co-led by Loh Meng See and Yeo Ning Hong.

History 
The GRC was formed during the 1991 Singaporean general election by merging four existing four Single Member Constituencies (SMC), Kampong Glam SMC, Cairnhill SMC, Moulmein SMC and Kim Seng SMC.

During the 1991 Singaporean general election, a People's Action Party team led by Loh Meng See and Yeo Ning Hong contested the GRC and was elected uncontested.

The GRC existed for one electoral term as it was dissolved in 1997, splitting back into Kampong Glam SMC and new Kreta Ayer–Tanglin Group Representation Constituency

Members of Parliament

Electoral results

See also
Kampong Glam Single Member Constituency

References

1991 General Election's result

Singaporean electoral divisions
Orchard Road